Hujqan (also Romanized as Hūjqān; also known as Howchqān and Hūchqān) is a village in Dowlatabad Rural District, in the Central District of Marand County, East Azerbaijan Province, Iran. At the 2006 census, its population was 1,913, in 515 families.

References 

Populated places in Marand County